The 2006 Canoe Slalom World Cup was a series of eight races in 4 canoeing and kayaking categories organized by the International Canoe Federation (ICF). It was the 19th edition. The series consisted of 4 continental championships (European, Pan American, Oceania and Asian), 3 world cup races and the world championships.

Calendar

Final standings 

The winner of each world cup race was awarded 30 points. Semifinalists were guaranteed at least 5 points and paddlers eliminated in heats received 2 points each. The continental championships had a lesser status with the winner earning 20 points, semifinalists at least 2 points and all others were awarded 1 point for participation. Because the continental championships were not open to all countries, every athlete could only compete in one of them. The world championships points scale was the same as for the world cups multiplied by a factor of 1.5. That meant the world champion earned 45 points, semifinalists got at least 7.5 points and paddlers eliminated in heats received 3 points apiece. If two or more athletes or boats were equal on points, the ranking was determined by their positions at the world championships.

Results

Oceania Championships 2006 

The Oceania Championships took place in Mangahao, New Zealand from 25 to 26 February.

World Cup Race 1 

World Cup Race 1 took place at the Hellinikon Olympic Canoe/Kayak Slalom Centre in Athens, Greece from 27 to 28 May.

World Cup Race 2 

World Cup Race 2 took place at the Augsburg Eiskanal, Germany from 2 to 4 June.

World Cup Race 3 

World Cup Race 3 took place at the Segre Olympic Park in La Seu d'Urgell, Spain from 10 to 11 June.

2006 European Championships 

The European Championships took place in L'Argentière-la-Bessée, France from 30 June to 2 July.

2006 World Championships 

The World Championships took place at the Prague-Troja Canoeing Centre, Czech Republic from 3 to 6 August.

2006 Pan American Championships 

The Pan American Championships took place in Madawaska, Ontario on 20 August.

2006 Asia Canoe Slalom Championships 

The Asia Canoe Slalom Championships took place in Zhangjiajie, China from 26 to 27 August.

References

External links 
 International Canoe Federation

Canoe Slalom World Cup
Canoe Slalom World Cup